Samuel Hemphill (5 July 1859 – 12 January 1927) was an Anglican priest in Ireland.

Hemphill was born in Clonmel and educated at Trinity College, Dublin. He was ordained deacon in 1883 and priest in 1885. His first post was a curacy at Holy Trinity, Rathmines.

He was Rector of Westport, County Mayo from 1888 to 1892; and of Birr, County Offaly from 1892 to 1914. He was Professor of Biblical Greek at Trinity College from 1888 to 1898. He was later Rector of Drumbeg, County Down; and Archdeacon of Down from 1923 until his death. He was also an Honorary Canon of Killaloe Cathedral and St Patricks Cathedral, Dublin; Examining Chaplain to the Bishop of Killaloe, the Archbishop of Armagh and the Bishop of Down; Chancellor of Christchurch Cathedral, Dublin and Treasurer of Down Cathedral.

He died in the vestry of his church before a wedding.

Works
 The Diatessaron of Tatian, 1888
 The Literature of the 2nd Century, 1891
 My Neighbour, 1897
 The Satires of Persius translated, 1900
 Immortality in Christ, 1904
 A History of the Revised Version of the New Testament, 1906

Arms

Notes

External links
 

People from Clonmel
19th-century Irish Anglican priests
20th-century Irish Anglican priests
1927 deaths
1859 births
Archdeacons of Down
Alumni of Trinity College Dublin
Academics of Trinity College Dublin